Astrolabe Bay is a large body of water off the south coast of Madang Province, Papua New Guinea, located at . It is a part of the Bismarck Sea and stretches from the Cape Iris in the south to the Cape Croisilles to the north. It was discovered in 1827 by Jules Dumont d'Urville and named after his ship. Capital of Madang Province, Madang lies on the coast of Astrolabe Bay.

See also
Astrolabe Bay Rural LLG
Naval Base Alexishafen

References

Bays of Papua New Guinea
Madang Province